The ANF Les Mureaux 170 was a prototype French fighter aircraft of the 1930s.  It was a single-engined, single-seat parasol monoplane, but only two were built, the type being rejected for service by the French Air Force.

Design and development

In 1930, the French Air Ministry issued a C.1 specification for a single-seat fighter, with the ability to reach 350 km/h (217 mph) and to be fitted with a supercharged engine. ANF Les Mureaux produced the ANF Les Mureaux 170, a parasol winged monoplane of all-metal construction powered by a single Hispano-Suiza 12Xbrs V12 engine. Its wings were slightly gulled and tapered out to give maximum chord and thickness midway along the wing, near where they were braced by struts to the fuselage. A fixed tailwheel undercarriage was fitted. The pilot sat in an open cockpit, and was armed by two Vickers machine guns mounted in the wings.

The first prototype flew on 19 November 1932, Although it demonstrated good performance, being described as the "fastest French service aircraft", it had a poor view from the cockpit when landing the aircraft, and despite a second prototype being flown in March 1934, the type was not chosen for production, with orders instead being placed for the Dewoitine D.500 and Blériot-SPAD S.510. It did, however, form the basis of the ANF Les Mureaux 180 two-seat fighter, also unsuccessful.

Specifications

See also

Notes

References

 Green, William and Gordon Swanborough. The Complete Book of Fighters. New York, Smithmark, 1994. .
"The Mureaux 170 C.1". Flight, 10 May 1934, p. 469.
"The Paris Air Show". Flight, 24 November 1932, pp. 1103–1112. 

Gull-wing aircraft
170
1930s French fighter aircraft
Aircraft first flown in 1932
Single-engined tractor aircraft
Cancelled military aircraft projects of France